Armand Pagnoulle (born 2 May 1901, date of death unknown) was a Belgian canoeist who competed in the 1936 Summer Olympics.

In 1936 he and his partner Charles Pasquier finished eighth in the folding K-2 10000 m event.

References

Sports-reference.com profile

1901 births
Belgian male canoeists
Canoeists at the 1936 Summer Olympics
Olympic canoeists of Belgium
Year of death missing
20th-century Belgian people